Myriapodology is the scientific study of myriapods which includes centipedes and millipedes. The field of myriapodology can also cover other myriapods such as pauropods and symphylans. Those who study myriapods are myriapodologists.

Societies
 International Society of Myriapodology

Journals
 International Journal of Myriapodology
 Myriapodologica
 Myriapod Memoranda

Notable myriapodologists
 Carl Attems (1868–1952), Austrian zoologist, described over 1,000 species
 Stanley Graham Brade-Birks (1887-1982), English myriapodologist who with Hilda K Brade-Birks authored Notes on Myriapoda: 23 papers jointly from 1916 to the 1920s; then twelve more solo until 1939
 Henry W. Brolemann (1860–1933), French myriapodologist, described around 500 species
 Ralph Vary Chamberlin (1879–1967), American arachnologist and myriapodologist, described over 1,000 species
 Orator F. Cook (1867–1949), American botanist and myriapodologist, co-described world's leggiest species, Illacme plenipes
 Richard L. Hoffman (1927–2012), American entomologist, described over 600 myriapod taxa
 C. A. W. Jeekel (1922–2010), Dutch entomologist, produced the Nomenclator Generum et Familiarum Diplopodorum which pioneered modern millipede taxonomy
 Otto Kraus (1930–2017), German myriapodologist and arachnologist, described nearly 500 species
 Robert Latzel (1845–1919), Austrian myriapodologist, pioneered use of gonopods in taxonomy
 Harold F. Loomis (1896–1976) American botanist and myriapodologist, described over 300 species
 Paola Manfredi (1889–1989) Italian myriapodologist
 Yu-Hsi Wang Moltze (1910–1968), Chinese myriapodologist
 Filippo Silvestri (1873–1949), Italian entomologist, described over 600 species
 Ödön Tömösváry (1852–1884), Hungarian naturalist, namesake of organ of Tömösváry
 Karl Wilhelm Verhoeff (1867–1944), German entomologist, described over 1,000 myriapod species

References

External links
 International Society of Myriapodology Official site
 International Journal of Myriapodology
 International Society of Myriapodology and Onychophorology
 British Myriapod & Isopod Group

 
Subfields of arthropodology